is a UK labour law case concerning the scope of protection for people to employment rights. It took the view that an employment contract requires

Facts
The Transport and General Workers Union negotiated with a management buy-out (via share transfer) prospector for a collective agreement that would mean less pay and worse conditions for members. Sixty three members, including Mr Carlton Henry, objected. The other 1,500 agreed to it. The sixty three claimed for unlawful wage deductions under Employment Rights Act 1996, section 13. Had their contracts been varied by collective agreement, in absence of an express incorporation clause in their contracts? There had been no ballot, which was workplace custom, so the 63 argued that there was no incorporation.

The Employment Tribunal upheld the claim of the sixty three, and by continuing to work for 2 years under protest, they had never consented. However the Employment Appeal Tribunal allowed the employer’s appeal, but remitted to trial whether a ballot was in fact reasonable, certain and notorious.

Judgment
Pill LJ rejected the employees’ appeal. It said, first, that the tribunal had not justified its conclusion that the employees had not consented by working normally for two years. Second, it needed to be asked whether it was customary – as well as a collective agreement with a ballot binding the workforce – if a collective agreement without a ballot could bind the workforce.

Longmore LJ and Sir Martin Nourse agreed.

See also

Contract of employment in English law
UK labour law
EU labour law
US labor law
German labour law

Notes

References

United Kingdom labour case law
Court of Appeal (England and Wales) cases
2001 in case law
2001 in British law
United Kingdom employment contract case law